An Inspector Calls is a play written by English dramatist J. B. Priestley, first performed in the Soviet Union in 1945 and at the New Theatre in London the following year. It is one of Priestley's best-known works for the stage and is considered to be one of the classics of mid-20th century English theatre. The play's success and reputation were boosted by a successful revival by English director Stephen Daldry for the National Theatre in 1992 and a tour of the UK in 2011–2012.

The play is a three-act drama which takes place on a single night on 5 April 1912. The play focusses on the prosperous upper middle-class Birling family, who live in a comfortable home in the fictional town of Brumley, "an industrial city in the north Midlands." The family is visited by a man calling himself Inspector Goole, who questions the family about the suicide of a young working-class woman in her mid-twenties. Long considered part of the repertory of classic drawing-room theatre, the play has also been hailed as a scathing criticism of the hypocrisies of Victorian and Edwardian English society and as an expression of Priestley's socialist political principles. The play is studied in many British schools as one of the prescribed texts for the English Literature GCSE.

Synopsis
At the Birlings' large home in the industrial town of Brumley, Arthur Birling who is a wealthy factory owner and local politician, celebrates his daughter Sheila's engagement to a rival magnate's son, Gerald Croft. Also in attendance are Arthur's wife Sybil and their young, alcoholic son Eric (whose drinking problem the family discreetly ignores). Following dinner, Arthur lectures them on the importance of self-reliance and looking after one's own, and talks of the bright future that awaits them (which, he believes, will include a place for himself on the next honours list). While the men confabulate, Sheila and Sybil leave the dining room to go into their Drawing Room. 

The evening is interrupted by the arrival of a man calling himself Inspector Goole, who is investigating the suicide of a young woman named Eva Smith. Her diary, the Inspector explains, refers to members of the Birling family. Goole produces a photograph of Eva and shows it to Arthur, who acknowledges that she worked in one of his factories. He explains that she was a skilled worker and was ready to receive a promotion; however two years ago Eva led a protest with most of the female workers because they wanted to be paid the same amount of money as a male factory worker would be. The strike lasted just under a week before the female workers decided to return to work, however Arthur fired Eva from Birling and Co. because she was the leader of the protest. Despite admitting that he left Eva without a job, Arthur denies responsibility for her death.

Sheila (having been sent by her mother to bring Arthur, Eric and Gerald to the drawing room) is shown the photograph of Eva. Inspector Goole prompts Sheila to confess that she knows Eva; Sheila explains that about a year ago she and Sybil were shopping in a department store called Milwards. Sheila noticed a nice dress that was for sale, however her mother told her it wouldn’t look very good on Sheila. Sheila was insistent on trying on the dress, so while her mother went for tea Sheila asked for help with trying on the dress. Eva was one of the two helpers (having been able to get a job in the store because of an outbreak of Influenza). As soon as Sheila looked in the mirror she realised the dress didn’t suit her and felt embarrassed. Eva smiled, which led Sheila to believe that Eva was making fun of her, though in reality Sheila imagined it. Sheila angrily ordered the Manager of the department store to fire Eva, threatening to have her mother stop shopping at the department store, which led the Manager to reluctantly fire Eva. Sheila’s real motivation, which she ashamedly confesses, was the jealousy that she felt towards the fact that Eva was prettier than her, and that the dress would have suited Eva’s figure much better than Sheila’s. Eric leaves the dining room.

Sybil enters the dining room shortly after. Inspector Goole then mentions Eva changing her name to Daisy Renton, Gerald is noticeably startled, and admits to having met a woman by that name in the Palace Bar (a notorious haunt of local prostitutes). Seeing that Daisy was hungry and struggling to cope financially (having to become a prostitute to try and earn a living) Gerald gave her money and arranged for her to move temporarily into a vacant flat belonging to one of Gerald's friends. Inspector Goole also forces Gerald to reveal that Eva began a relationship with Gerald over the summer. To Eva, he was "the most important person in her life", but they parted after a few months, which Eva took surprisingly well. Arthur and Sybil are horrified, and Sheila returns her engagement ring to Gerald, while sincerely appreciating his honesty. Gerald leaves for a walk.

Goole turns to Sybil next, whom he identifies as a keen patron for a charity that helps women in difficult situations, where Eva (who was by then pregnant and destitute) later turned to for help. Sybil, however, convinced the committee to deny her application for financial aid due to believing Eva had been irresponsible and suggested that Eva find the father of her child and tell him to help her, despite Eva saying he wouldn’t be of any use numerous times. Despite vigorous cross-examination from Goole, she denies any wrongdoing. Goole then plays his final card, which makes Sybil lay the blame on the "drunken young man" who got Eva pregnant. It slowly dawns on the rest of the family, except Sybil, that Eric is the young man who impregnated Eva.

Eric then enters, and after brief questioning from Goole, breaks down and admits responsibility for the pregnancy, having raped Eva after a drinking spree at the Palace Bar. After finding out that Eva was pregnant, Eric stole funds from his father's business in order to support Eva and their child, but she refused the stolen money after a while and encouraged Eric to leave her alone. Eric is stricken with remorse for his actions. Arthur and Sybil are outraged by Eric's behaviour, and the evening dissolves into angry recriminations.

Goole's questioning has revealed that each person present that evening had contributed in some way to Eva's suicide (which also killed the child she was pregnant with). He reminds the Birlings that actions have consequences and that all people are intertwined in one society. As Goole leaves he warns the family that "If men will not learn that lesson, then they will be taught it in fire and blood and anguish" – an allusion to the impending war.

Gerald returns, and tells the family of his growing suspicion that there may in fact be no "Inspector Goole" on the police force. Arthur makes a phone call to the chief constable, who confirms this. Learning from a second call by Gerald to the infirmary that no recent cases of suicide have been reported, the family surmise that the Inspector was a fraud and that they have been the victims of a hoax. Gerald and the elder Birlings celebrate in relief, but Eric and Sheila still feel guilty over their past conduct, and resolve to change their ways for the better.

A twist in the plot is revealed, with Mr Birling receiving a phone call, from which he learns that a young woman has just died at the infirmary in a suspected suicide, and that the police are on their way to question the family.

Goole's true identity is left unexplained, but it is clear that the family's confessions over the course of the evening have all been true, and that public disgrace will soon befall them.

Characters

Inspector Goole 
The mysterious "Inspector Goole" claims to have seen Eva Smith's dead body earlier that day, and to have been given "a duty" to investigate her death and the Birlings' involvement in it. He seems to be familiar with every detail of the case already, interrogating the family solely to reveal their guilt rather than to discover unknown information. Both during and after Goole's visit, the Birlings question his credentials, and a phone call to the local police station reveals there is no one by his name on the force. Many critics and audiences have interpreted Goole's role as that of an "avenging angel" because of his supernatural omniscience and all-knowing final warning, and even because of his name, which is a homophone for the word "ghoul". It is suggested in the final scene that a quite real investigation will follow Goole's, and his purpose has been to warn the family in advance and encourage them to accept responsibility for their wrongdoing.

Arthur Birling 
Arthur Birling is described as "a heavy-looking, rather portentous man in his middle fifties". He represents the capitalist ruling class, repeatedly describing himself with pride as a "hard-headed businessman", and is arguably the main subject of Priestley's social critique. Dominant, arrogant, self-centred, and morally blind, his stubbornness is shown when refusing responsibility for Eva's death; he fired her in order to quell dissent among his workforce and keep labour costs low, which he says is standard business practice. He remains unaffected by the details of the suicide, and his own concerns appear to be avoiding scandal, insisting that Eric account for the company money he stole, and convincing Sheila to reconsider her break with Gerald (so as to secure a promised Croft-Birling merger).
He is the embodiment of the self-centred upper classes. Arthur Birling is an arrogant and dismissive character used by Priestley as a dramatic vehicle to criticise capitalism, the arrogance of the upper classes, and the ignorance of the elder generations.

Sybil Birling 
Sybil Birling, "a rather cold woman" of about fifty, is Arthur's wife. As the leader of a charitable organisation, she assumes a social and moral superiority over Inspector Goole, whose questioning style she frequently refers to as "impertinent" and "offensive". Like her husband, she refuses to accept responsibility for the death of Eva Smith, and seems more concerned with maintaining the family's reputation, even going so far as to lie and deny that she recognizes the girl's picture. She derides women like Eva as immoral, dishonest, and greedy.

Sheila Birling 
Sheila Birling is the daughter of Arthur and Sybil Birling, and the older sister of Eric. Sheila begins as a naive and self-centred young woman, but becomes the most sympathetic member of the Birling family over the course of the play, being insecure about her appearance, showing remorse for her part in Eva's downfall and encouraging her family to do the same. By the play's end her social conscience has been awakened and she has a new awareness of her responsibilities to others. She represents the younger generation's break from the selfish behaviour and capitalist views of its forebears. Sheila shows her naivety and lack of maturity in the way she reacts to her father. She is quick to apologise, it is clear that she is keen to behave well. She also refers to her father as 'Daddy', a childish term. As the play progresses, Sheila's character develops and she begins to stand up for herself.

Eric Birling 
Eric Birling is the son of Arthur and Sybil Birling and the younger brother of Sheila. Eric is presented as a "Jack the Lad" character with a drinking habit, which led to him raping Eva and getting her pregnant. He is distanced from the rest of the family and feels he cannot talk to them about his problems. With his sister, he repents of, and accepts responsibility for, the way he treated Eva.

Gerald Croft 
The son of Sir George and Lady Croft of Crofts Limited, a competitor of Birling and Company, he is at the Birling residence to celebrate his recent engagement to Sheila. Gerald's revealed affair with Eva puts an end to the relationship, though Sheila commends him for his truthfulness and for his initial compassion towards the girl. Gerald believes that Goole is not a police inspector, that the family may not all be referring to the same woman, and that there may not be a body. Initially, he appears to be correct and does not think the Birlings have anything to feel ashamed of or worry about. He seems excited at the prospect of unmasking the "false" Inspector and seems almost desperate for others to believe him.

Edna  
Edna is the Birlings' maid, and she represents a working-class member of the Birling household.
When the inspector visits the Birling's house she says "an Inspector's called." She is asked to stay up late during the play by Mrs Birling to make tea for the Birling family.

Reception and interpretation
Highly successful after its first and subsequent London productions, the play is now considered one of Priestley's greatest works, and has been subject to a variety of critical interpretations.

After the new wave of social realist theatre in the 1950s and 1960s, the play fell out of fashion, and was dismissed as an example of outdated bourgeois "drawing room" dramas, but became a staple of regional repertory theatre. Following several successful revivals (including Stephen Daldry's 1992 production for the National Theatre), the play was "rediscovered" and hailed as a damning social criticism of capitalism and middle-class hypocrisy in the manner of the social realist dramas of Shaw and Ibsen. It has been read as a parable about the destruction of Victorian social values and the disintegration of pre-World War I English society, and Goole's final speech has been interpreted variously as a quasi-Christian vision of hell and judgement, and as a socialist manifesto.

The struggle between the embattled patriarch Arthur Birling and Inspector Goole has been interpreted by many critics as a symbolic confrontation between capitalism and socialism, and arguably demonstrates Priestley's socialist political criticism of the perceived selfishness and moral hypocrisy of middle-class capitalist society in 1950s Britain. While no single member of the Birling family is solely responsible for Eva's death, together they function as a hermetic class system that exploits neglected, vulnerable women, with each example of exploitation leading collectively to Eva's social exclusion, despair and suicide. The play also arguably acts as a critique of Victorian-era notions of middle-class philanthropy towards the poor, which is based on presumptions of the charity-givers' social superiority and severe moral judgement towards the "deserving poor". The romantic idea of gentlemanly chivalry towards "fallen women" is also debunked as being based on male lust and sexual exploitation of the weak by the powerful. In Goole's final speech, Eva Smith is referred to as a representation of millions of other vulnerable working-class people, and can be read as a call to action for English society to take more responsibility for working-class people, prefiguring the development of the post-World War II welfare state.

Productions
An Inspector Calls was first performed in 1945 in two Russian theatres (Moscow's Kamerny Theatre and Leningrad's Comedy Theatre), as a suitable British venue could not be found. Priestley had written the play in a single week and all Britain's theatres had already been booked for the season. The play had its first British production in 1946 at the New Theatre in London with Ralph Richardson as Inspector Goole, Harry Andrews as Gerald Croft, Margaret Leighton as Sheila Birling, Julien Mitchell as Arthur Birling, Marian Spencer as Sybil Birling and Alec Guinness as Eric Birling.

The first Broadway production opened at the Booth Theatre on 21 October 1947 and ran until 10 January 1948. The production was staged by Cedric Hardwicke.

The play was produced and performed at the Ferdowsi Theatre in Iran in late 1940s based on the translation by Bozorg Alavi. It was staged in the first season of the Edinburgh Gateway Company in 1953.

In 1986 Richard Wilson directed a production at the Royal Exchange, Manchester with Geraldine Alexander as Sheila Birling, Hugh Grant as Eric Birling and Graeme Garden as Inspector Goole.

Tom Baker played Inspector Goole in a 1987 production directed by Peter Dews and designed by Daphne Dare that opened at Theatr Clwyd on 14 April then transferred to London's Westminster Theatre on 13 May 1987. The cast included Pauline Jameson as Sybil Birling, Peter Baldwin as Arthur Birling, Charlotte Attenborough as Sheila Birling, Simon Shepherd as Gerald Croft and Adam Godley as Eric Birling.

A revival of the play by British director Stephen Daldry (produced by PW Productions) opened at the National Theatre's Lyttelton Theatre in September 1992. Daldry's concept was to reference two eras: the 1945 post-war era, when the play was written, and the ostensible historical setting for the work in pre-war 1912; this emphasised the way the character Goole was observing, and deploring, the Birling family's behaviour from Priestley's own cultural viewpoint. It won the Drama Desk Award for Outstanding Revival of a Play, and was widely praised for making the work involving and politically relevant for a modern audience. The production is often credited with single-handedly rediscovering Priestley's works and "rescuing" him from the reputation of being obsolete and class-bound, although the production had some detractors, including Sheridan Morley who regarded it as a gimmicky travesty of the author's patent intentions. The success of the production since 1992 has led to a critical reappraisal of Priestley as a politically engaged playwright who offered a sustained critique of the hypocrisy of English society. A Broadway transfer of the production starring Philip Bosco opened at the Royale Theatre (now the Bernard Jacobs Theatre) on 27 April 1994 and played 454 performances.

 The Stephen Daldry production went on a tour of the UK in 2011 and continued to tour into 2020, with Tom Mannion and Liam Brennan  among the actors playing Inspector Goole. The production returned to the Playhouse in London's West End in November 2016, with Liam Brennan in the name part.

Another production opened on 25 October 1995 at the Garrick Theatre and ran for six years until its transfer to the Playhouse Theatre in 2001. In 2009 it reopened at the Novello Theatre for a year-long run, followed by another transfer to Wyndham's Theatre in December 2009, running for only four months.

Adaptations
The play has been adapted to film or television at least six times, including:

 A 1954 British film, directed by Guy Hamilton
 A 1965 Bengali film "Thana Theke Aschi", directed by Hiren Nag.
 A 1979 Soviet film "Inspektor Gull" by A.  Proshkin.
 A 1982 British television serial, directed by Michael Simpson
 A 2015 Hong Kong film, directed by Raymond Wong and Herman Yau
 A 2015 British television film, directed by Aisling Walsh
 A 2018 British film, directed by Jason Farries.
 A 2022 play at the Yvonne Arnaud Theatre

Awards and nominations 
Awards
1993 Laurence Olivier Award for Best Revival
 1994 Drama Desk Award for Best Revival of a Play
 1994 Tony Award for Best Revival of a Play

Editions

References

External links

 
 Arthur Birling in GCSE English 

1945 plays
British plays adapted into films
Broadway plays
Drama Desk Award-winning plays
Plays by J. B. Priestley
Off-Broadway plays
Laurence Olivier Award-winning plays
Tony Award-winning plays
West End plays